Joshua Vincent Faga (born August 22, 1990) is an American soccer coach and former American professional soccer player who played as a defender for the Rochester Rhinos in the USL Pro and for the Rochester Lancers (2011–15) in the Major Arena Soccer League. He is currently the assistant coach for men's soccer at Marshall University. In 2020, he helped the program to capture the 2020 NCAA National Championship

Coaching career

Marshall University 
In August 2019, Faga was named the assistant men's soccer coach at Marshall University. During the 2019 NCAA College Soccer season, Faga helped lead the Thundering Herd to the 2019 Conference USA Men's Soccer Tournament Championship and Regular Season Championship. 2019 also saw Marshall reach the 2019 NCAA Division I Men's Soccer Tournament "Sweet 16" as the #11 seed eventually losing to University of Washington.

During the 2020 season, Faga and the Marshall Thundering Herd captured the 2020 NCAA National Championship. Days after winning the 2020 NCAA Tournament, Faga and the rest of the coaching staff, led by Head Coach Chris Grassie, were recognized as the United Soccer Coaches College Coach of the Year.

Duquesne University 
In August 2014, Faga was named the assistant men's soccer coach at Duquesne University. Faga helped the Duquesne Dukes reach the Atlantic 10 Conference Championships on 3 separate occasions: 2014, 2015, & 2016.

Honors

Coaching

Marshall University
 C-USA regular season champions: 2019, 2020
 C-USA Tournament champions: 2019
 NCAA College Cup: 2020

Playing career

College
Born in Lexington, Kentucky, Faga began his collegiate career at St. John's University where he played for the St. John's Red Storm men's soccer team. After two years at St. John's, Faga transferred to Marist College where he played for the Marist Red Foxes men's soccer team. While with Marist Faga was part of the All-MAAC Second Team in 2010 and 2012.

Rochester Rhinos

In December 2012 Faga attended a workout session with the Rochester Rhinos in the USL Pro and after the workout he was invited to the InfoSport's 13th annual Pro Soccer Combine in Florida. After the camp Faga signed a professional deal with the Rhinos on March 25, 2013. Faga then made his professional debut for the club on May 28, 2013 in the third round of the 2013 US Open Cup against the New England Revolution.

Rochester Lancers
In September 2013, Faga signed with the Rochester Lancers in the MASL. Faga went on to appear in 18 games during his first campaign with the club as a defender.

Career statistics

Podcast

Just Kickin' It Podcast 
Since 2015, Faga has hosted the very popular coaching education podcast, The Just Kickin' It Podcast. To date, the show has over 150 episodes featuring some of the top coaches from around the world including Rene Meulensteen, Anson Dorrance, and Raymond Verheijen.

Books 

 The Real Giants of Soccer Coaching. Meyer and Meyer Sports. 2018. 

In 2018, Faga wrote his first book titled, "The Real Giants of Soccer Coaching: Insights and Wisdom from the Game's Greatest Coaches" which is a collection of the curated thoughts of nearly 30 top soccer coaches around the globe collected during interviews spanning a 3-year time period. The book was ranked as high as the Top 20 "Coaching" books on Amazon.

References

External links
 Rochester Rhinos Profile.

1990 births
Living people
Sportspeople from Lexington, Kentucky
American soccer players
FC Buffalo players
St. John's Red Storm men's soccer players
Chicago Fire U-23 players
Rochester New York FC players
Association football defenders
Soccer players from Kentucky
USL League Two players
USL Championship players
Marist Red Foxes men's soccer players
Marshall Thundering Herd men's soccer coaches
Duquesne Dukes men's soccer coaches